Amir, previously known as Timsar, is the honorific title used for officers of high rank, ranking 2nd Brigadier General and higher in the Islamic Republic of Iran Army. The title is also used to address Law Enforcement Force of Islamic Republic of Iran commanders, except for those who previously have served in the Islamic Revolutionary Guard Corps, where "Sardar" is equivalent to the title. Amirs are often graduates of the University of Command and Staff (DAFOOS).

Ranks being addressed by the title in Ground Force, Air Force and Air Defense Base include:

Ranks being addressed by the title in the Navy include:

References 

Titles in Iran